Boune may refer to:

Boune, Niger
Boune, Senegal